Gastón Luis Parra Luzardo (December 9, 1933 – December 14, 2008) was a Venezuelan academic, who until his death was president of the Central Bank of Venezuela. He was appointed to the position in 2005. In 2002 he was briefly chairman of the state-owned oil giant Petróleos de Venezuela S.A. Parra died on December 14, 2008, at the age of 75, at the Caracas hospital after a long time of illness.

References

1933 births
2008 deaths
Presidents of the Central Bank of Venezuela
20th-century Venezuelan businesspeople
University of Zulia alumni
Members of the Venezuelan Constituent Assembly of 1999
Presidents of PDVSA